The Journal of Dental Research is a peer-reviewed medical journal that covers all aspects of dentistry. The editor-in-chief is Nicholas Jakubovics (Newcastle University, UK). It was established in 1919 and is published by SAGE Publications on behalf of the International and American Association for Dental Research.

Abstracting and indexing 
The journal is abstracted and indexed in Scopus and the Science Citation Index. According to the Journal Citation Reports, the journal has an impact factor of 8.924 for the year 2021.

References

External links 
 
 International & American Associations for Dental Research

SAGE Publishing academic journals
English-language journals
Dentistry journals
Monthly journals
Publications established in 1919